Miry may refer to:

People
 Karel Miry (1823–1889) Belgian composer

Places
 Miry Ridge, Smokey Mountains, Tennessee, USA; a ridgeline defining an edge of the watershed of the Little River (Tennessee)
 Rural Municipality of Miry Creek No. 229, Saskatchewan, Canada
 Miry Brook, Danbury, Connecticut, USA

Rivers
 Miry Branch, Delaware, USA; a brook, see List of rivers of Delaware
 Miry Creek, USA; a left tributary of the Dan River 
 Miry Creek, Canada; a watercourse on the voyaging/portaging route to Fort Pelly, Saskatchewan
 Miry Gut, North Carolina, USA; a brook and tributary of the South River; see List of rivers of North Carolina
 Miry Run, New Jersey, USA; a brook and tributary of the Assunpink Creek
 Miry Wash, Utah, USA; a creek, see List of rivers of Utah

See also

 Augustyn Mirys (1700–1790) Polish painter
 Miry Hole Branch, Jones County, North Carolina, USA; a first-order tributary of the Trent River
 Miry Creek Golf Course, Cabri, Saskatchewan, Canada; see List of golf courses in Saskatchewan